Kate Copstick (born 25 February 1956 in Glasgow) is a  Scottish actress, television presenter, writer, critic, director and producer. She studied for a law degree at the University of Glasgow.

Career
As a comedy actor, Copstick appeared on children's TV shows No. 73 in the 1980s, and ChuckleVision in the 1990s. She played the titular role in children's series Marlene Marlowe Investigates, and performed as part of the ensemble cast of former Saturday morning BBC children's show On the Waterfront. Copstick executive-produced the Natural Born Racers TV series that followed the Virgin Mobile Yamaha R6 Cup.

Copstick is a commentator on human sexuality. After years writing for the Erotic Review, she became its owner in 2009.

At the Edinburgh Festival Fringe, Copstick was a Perrier Comedy Award judge in 2003 and  2004 and a Malcolm Hardee Award judge in 2008–2015. She lends her voice to the announcements at Fort William railway station.

Work with charitable organisations 

Copstick has worked in Kenya with HIV+ women and their families. Through the Children With AIDS Charity, of which she is vice-chair, she started Mama Biashara ("Business Mother") in 2008, working to set these women up in small businesses, thus making them financially independent.<ref>Fleming John (15 February 2019), "Kate Copstick and the sexually-abused girl being held in a Nairobi hospital", So It Goes.</ref> She made Positive Thinking for BBC 1, a documentary on HIV/AIDS aimed at children. She is a patron of the Waverley Care Trust.

Personal life

Copstick was attacked and robbed close to her home in west London in September 2022. The robbers took £8,500 that she had raised for her charity Mama Biashara.

Filmography
ActressThe Basil Brush Show (1 episode, 2003)ChuckleVision (10 episodes, 1992–2000)Marlene Marlowe Investigates (1993) TV seriesA Bit of Fry and Laurie (1 episode, 1992)On the Waterfront (12 episodes, 1988)No. 73 (20 episodes, 1986–1987)
WriterHotel Getaway (8 episodes, 2000–2003)On the Waterfront (24 episodes, 1988–1989)Lose A MillionSelfShow Me the Funny (2011) - Judge (TV)Dawn Goes Lesbian (2008) - InstructorThe If.comedy Awards: A Comedy Cuts Special (2007) (TV)RIP 2002 (2002) (TV)Hotel Getaway (1 episode, 2000)No Kidding (1991) - PresenterCrosswits - Regular PanelistOn the Waterfront (12 episodes, 1989)So You Want to be Top? (1983) (TV)- Co-host

BibliographyMasterclass: Girl on Girl: Erotic Print Society, January 2008.  - Porn Week: Erotic Print Society, May 2007.  - The Illustrated Book of Sapphic Sex'': Erotic Print Society, May 2000.  -

References

External links
 
 Interview, Curio Festival, 3 September 2007
 Edinburgh Festival 2008 video blog
 Links to articles by Kate Copstick
 RDF Management
 UK Gameshows
 TV.com
 Bobbysgirl Productions

1956 births
British women television producers
Living people
Mass media people from Glasgow
Scottish musical theatre actresses
Scottish television actresses
Scottish television personalities
Scottish television producers
Scottish voice actresses
Scottish women comedians
Alumni of the University of Glasgow